Brian DeMarco (born April 9, 1972) is a former NFL offensive lineman. He was drafted in the 2nd round of the 1995 NFL Draft by the Jacksonville Jaguars. He played college football at Michigan State University.

NFL career
After being drafted by the Jaguars, he was a starter for their inaugural season. Demarco played four seasons for the Jaguars. He signed a 3-year deal with the Cincinnati Bengals in 1999, but he retired after that season due to injuries.

Post NFL
DeMarco's post-NFL plight was featured in a Men's Journal article entitled "Casualties of the NFL."  It detailed devastating spinal damage DeMarco received while playing in the NFL, and continued playing with for sometime after. The piece received widespread praise from advocates who sought medical and financial help for disabled NFL retirees. Like most NFL players DeMarco took painkillers to mask the pain so he could continue playing causing further damage to his body.

Footnotes

1972 births
Living people
American football offensive linemen
Jacksonville Jaguars players
Cincinnati Bengals players
Michigan State Spartans football players